The Ayah of Khayr ol-Bareyyah is the seventh verse of Al-Bayyina Surah of Islam's holy book, the Quran, which, according to the famous exegesis book such as Al-Mizan and Majma' al-Bayan, refers to the spiritual position of Ali ibn Abi Talib and his Shiites. The literal translation of the title is the best of creatures.

Context

Cause of revelation

Sunni exegesis

Hakem Haskani
Hakem Haskani, a Sunni scholar, quotes in the book Shawahed ol-Tanzil le-Qawaed al-Tafzil as follows:

Shia exegesis

Shaykh Tabarsi
Abu Ali Fadhl ibn Hasan Tabresi, one of the Shiite scholars, in the book Majma' al-Bayan in the following of the verse of Khayr ol-Bareyyah, quotes from Abu'l-Qasim Ali ibn al-Hasan al-Kalbi, quoting Jabir ibn Abd Allah:

Muhammad Husayn Tabatabai
Muhammad Husayn Tabatabai in the book Tafsir al-Mizan says in the following of the verse of Khayr ol-Bareyyah:

Naser Makarem Shirazi
Naser Makarem Shirazi in the book Tafsir Nemooneh in the discussion of Ali and his Shiites, quotes as follows:

See also
 Verse of Wilayah
 Obedience Verse
 Verse of Ikmal al-Din
 Al-Tabligh Verse
 Verse of Purification
 Verse of Mawadda
 Imamate and guardianship of Ali ibn Abi Talib

References

Shia Islam
Ali
Quranic verses